Laro Herrero Echevarri (born 17 January 1990 in Santander)  is a Spanish snowboarder.

He participated for the first time at the Olympic Winter Games in Sochi 2014 where he was 33rd. He was eliminated at the eight finals finishing fifth in his heat.

Olympic results

References

Spanish male snowboarders
Snowboarders at the 2014 Winter Olympics
Snowboarders at the 2018 Winter Olympics
Olympic snowboarders of Spain
1990 births
Living people
People from Santander, Spain
21st-century Spanish people